Newman Ronald Hoar (4 September 1920 – 11 January 2017) was a New Zealand cricketer who played first-class cricket from 1943 to 1945. 

A lower-order batsman and opening bowler, Hoar played his first two first-class matches for New Zealand services teams during World War II while serving with the Royal New Zealand Air Force. He later played four matches for Wellington in the 1944–45 season. His highest score was 76, batting at number eight and top-scoring for Wellington against Canterbury in January 1945, and his best bowling figures were 3 for 68 against Auckland in his last first-class match a month later.

He also played Hawke Cup cricket from 1939 to 1959, representing Wairarapa and Nelson. In a Hawke Cup match for Wairarapa against Rangitikei in 1945–46 he scored 158 and 16 and took 5 for 48 and 3 for 41. In a two-day match for Nelson against Fiji in 1953–54 he scored 109 not out in 93 minutes.

Hoar and his wife Margaret had two daughters and three sons. He died at Masterton on 11 January 2017, and was buried at Riverside Park Lawn Cemetery.

References

External links

1920 births
2017 deaths
New Zealand cricketers
Wellington cricketers
Cricketers from Masterton
New Zealand military personnel of World War II
Royal New Zealand Air Force personnel
Royal New Zealand Air Force cricketers
New Zealand Services cricketers